George John Frederick Sackville, 4th Duke of Dorset (15 November 179314 February 1815), styled Earl of Middlesex until 1799, was a British nobleman.

The only son of John Sackville, 3rd Duke of Dorset and his wife Arabella, he was educated at Harrow and Christ Church, Oxford, receiving a MA from the latter on 30 June 1813.

He was appointed High Steward of Stratford-on-Avon, and was commissioned as a captain in the Sevenoaks and Bromley Regiment of Local Militia on 27 April 1813 then on 26 July the same year he was promoted to Lieutenant-Colonel Commandant of the regiment. However, he died in February 1815, of a fall from his horse while hunting on Killiney Hill in County Dublin. He had no children, so he was succeeded as duke by his cousin Charles Sackville-Germain. His estate of Knole passed to his sister Elizabeth Sackville-West, Countess De La Warr.

References

1793 births
1815 deaths
Alumni of Christ Church, Oxford
Kent Militia officers
Deaths by horse-riding accident in Ireland
104
People educated at Harrow School
George
Earls of Dorset